Sally Schneider is a journalist and Founding Editor of the website 'the improvised life'. A former chef, Schneider is author of The Improvisational Cook, A New Way to Cook and The Art of Low Calorie Cooking. She has won numerous awards including four James Beard Foundation Awards for her books and journalism.   A New Way to Cook was named “One of the Best Food Books of the Decade” by the Guardian. She is a columnist for The Atlantic Monthly Food Blog  as well as a radio commentator for the national public radio show "The Splendid Table".

Personal life and influences
Schneider was born and raised in Greenwich Village.
Raised by a Greek mother and German father in an Italian neighborhood, her inspirations growing up were American regional, southern, French and Mediterranean foods, a culinary mélange that ranged from chicken pot pie, smothered pork chops and beach plum jelly, to boeuf bourgignon  and cheese soufflés, to skordalia and endless varieties of phyllo pastries. Schneider’s mother knew Dione Lucas, Julia Child's precursor, and was strongly influenced by her classic French technique which she passed on to her daughter.
Another major influence in Schneider’s life has been a small town called Helvetia in the West Virginia Appalachians, that had been settled by Swiss immigrants in the 1860s. After Schneider visited a ramp (wild leek) festival  in the town in the early seventies, she returned yearly to document and write about the compelling and unexpected culture that she found there, a mix of Swiss and Appalachian, that manifested in unique foodways, art, music, architecture and story-telling. Over the years, Helvetia became home and its people a second family. Schneider has lectured and published numerous articles about Helvetia, including entrees in The Encyclopedia of Appalachia.
A lover of food, culture, photography, and design, Schneider has traveled extensively throughout the United States, Italy, France, Spain, Greece, Ireland, North Africa, Peru, Brazil, Mexico, Argentina, and Guadeloupe.

Career
Schneider has worked as a journalist, editor, teacher, food stylist, lecturer, and small-space consultant. She began her career in food working in restaurants in the 1970s. As a captain at the Sign of the Dove, she was one of the first women to work in elite Manhattan restaurants that had long held a men-only hiring policy, a policy that changed with the loss of a suit brought by the American Civil Liberties Union. Preferring cooking to service, and with no professional culinary training, Schneider started working in New York City restaurant kitchens, including The Soho Charcuterie and Le Petit Robert, eventually becoming a chef. For several years, she ran her own catering business until she segued, into food styling and magazine writing.

A brief stint as Associate Food Editor at a diet and health magazine was the catalyst for Schneider’s eventual focus on a new approach to healthy cooking; it embraced the traditional taboos of butter, cream, goosefat, and other rich fats, used in moderation, with innovative cooking techniques.  She developed these ideas in her long-running Food & Wine Magazine column “Well-Being” and her ground-breaking tome “A New Way to Cook”. This book also launched a central theme in Schneider’s work, that of improvising. She developed new ways of writing recipes to incorporate information and ideas that would encourage people to improvise on the basic theme. Her 2001 award-winning cookbook The Improvisational Cook  explored this concept more fully, with chapters on The Creative Mindset, Accidents and the Unexpected, Understanding Flavor, Learning What Goes with What, Making Flavors Come to Life: Salt and Other Absolutely Essential Seasonings and The Essential Pantry: Long-Keeping Ingredients as Opportunity.

As a food stylist, Schneider worked with such notable photographers as Irving Penn, Hiro, Annie Leibovitz and Maria Robledo. She once wrangled 600 live snails for the photographer Irving Penn for a photograph that is in the Museum of Modern Art.

One of Schneider’s most curious works, a collaborative artist's book project printed in limited edition by A.S.C. Rower's Flockophobic Press, is The Onion As It Is Cooked, a poem by Steven "Jesse" Bernstein impressed into a sheet of saffron pasta.  It has been collected by notable rare book collections including The Yale’s Beineke Rare Book and Manuscript Library, MOMA and the Victoria & Albert Museum.

In 2009, Schneider launched ‘the improvised life’, a lifestyle blog about improvising as a daily practice. It inspires readers to  “create, design, be resourceful, make it up as you go along”.  It has been called “a zeitgeist-perfect blog”. She blogs daily about embracing the messy, imperfect and makeshift. Schneider's varied work has been the laboratory for the themes she writes and lectures about: improvising as an essential operating principle; cultivating resourcefulness and your “inner artist;” design, style, food — anything — that is cost effective, resourceful, and “outside the box.”

Publications
The Art of Low Calorie Cooking (1990)
The Onion As It Is Cooked (1990)
A New Way to Cook (2001)
The Improvisational Cook (2006)

References

External links 
 
 'the improvised life'

American women journalists
Living people
James Beard Foundation Award winners
Year of birth missing (living people)
21st-century American women